Garikapadu may refer to:

Places

Andhra Pradesh, India 
Garikapadu, Guntur district
Garikapadu, Krishna district